Bert Reed (born June 1, 1988) is a former American football wide receiver.

College career
Reed played wide receiver for Florida State.

Professional career

Cleveland Browns
Reed signed with the Cleveland Browns practice squad on May 9, 2012, but was cut on August 26.

Tampa Bay Buccaneers
He then signed with the Tampa Bay Buccaneers on September 3, but was released 2 days later.

Denver Broncos
Reed signed with the Denver Broncos on October 2, but was again released on the 9th.

Pittsburgh Steelers
Reed signed on the Pittsburgh Steelers practice squad on November 28. The Steelers released Reed from the practice squad on December 12, 2012.

Jacksonville Sharks
On June 2, 2014, Reed was signed by the Jacksonville Sharks of the Arena Football League (AFL).

Las Vegas Outlaws
On December 22, 2014, Reed was selected by the Las Vegas Outlaws in the 2014 Expansion Draft.

References

Further reading

1988 births
Living people
American football wide receivers
Florida State Seminoles football players
People from Panama City, Florida
Players of American football from Florida
Jacksonville Sharks players
Las Vegas Outlaws (arena football) players